Nizhnesapashevo (Tübänge Hapaş) is a rural locality (a village) in Yalchinsky Selsoviet, Kugarchinsky District, Bashkortostan, Russia. The population was 296 as of 2010. There are 2 streets.

Geography 
Nizhnesapashevo is located 43 km northwest of Mrakovo (the district's administrative centre) by road. Yalchino is the nearest rural locality.

References 

Rural localities in Kugarchinsky District